Lost Souvenirs (French: Souvenirs perdus) is a 1950 French drama film directed by Christian-Jaque and starring Bernard Blier, Pierre Brasseur and Suzy Delair.

The film's sets were designed by the art director Robert Gys. It was shot at the Billancourt Studios in Paris and on location around the city.

Partial cast
 Bernard Blier as L'agent de police Raoul (segment "Le violon")  
 Pierre Brasseur as Philippe (segment "Une statuette d'Osiris")  
 Suzy Delair as Suzy Henebey (episode "Une couronne mortuaire")  
 Danièle Delorme as Danièle (segment "Une cravate de fourrure")  
 Edwige Feuillère as Florence (segment "Une statuette d'Osiris")  
 Yves Montand as Raoul, un chanteur des rues (segment "Le violon")  
 François Périer as Jean-Pierre Delagrange (episode "Une couronne mortuaire")  
 Gérard Philipe as Gérard de Narçay (segment "Une cravate de fourrure")  
 Armand Bernard as Armand, le majordome de Jean-Pierre (episode "Une couronne mortuaire") 
 Léonce Corne as Le vendeur de billets de loterie (segment "Le violon")  
 Gilberte Géniat as Solange, l'épicière (segment "Le violon")  
 Yolande Laffon as Mme Delagrange (episode "Une couronne mortuaire")  
 Daniel Lecourtois as Le directeur de l'hôtel  
 Jacques Tarride as Le scrétaire  
 Christian Simon as Le petit Raoul  
 Jean Davy as Le speaker

References

Bibliography 
 Edward Baron Turk. Child of Paradise: Marcel Carné and the Golden Age of French Cinema. Harvard University Press, 1989.

External links 
 

1950 drama films
French drama films
1950 films
1950s French-language films
Films directed by Christian-Jaque
Films shot at Billancourt Studios
Films shot in Paris
French black-and-white films
Films scored by Joseph Kosma
1950s French films